The 2012–13 Sussex County Football League season was the 88th in the history of Sussex County Football League a football competition in England.

Division One

Division One featured 19 clubs which competed in the division last season, along with three new clubs, promoted from Division Two:
Dorking Wanderers
East Preston
Hailsham Town

For this season only, the FA were to promote a second club from two of the following six Step 5 leagues: Combined Counties League, Eastern Counties League, Essex Senior League, Kent League, Spartan South Midlands League and the Sussex County League. This was to fulfil the expansion of the Isthmian League Divisions One North and South from 22 to 24 clubs each.  The two clubs were to be promoted on a points per game basis, and the two runners-up with the best PPG were VCD Athletic (Kent Football League) and Guernsey (Combined Counties League). Three others – Aylesbury United (Spartan South Midlands League), Redhill (Sussex County League) and Barkingside (Essex Senior League) – were also confirmed as promoted by the FA on 17 May, due to resignations and non-promotions elsewhere.
From this league, only Horsham YMCA, Peacehaven & Telscombe and Redhill applied for promotion.

League table

Results

Division Two

Division Two featured 15 clubs which competed in the division last season, along with three new clubs, promoted from Division Three:
Broadbridge Heath
Newhaven
Saltdean United

League table

Results

Division Three

Division Three featured ten clubs which competed in the division last season, along with two new clubs, joined from the West Sussex League:
Billingshurst
Sidlesham

Also, Ifield Edwards changed name to Ifield.

League table

Results

References

External links
 Sussex County Football League

2012-13
9